In computer graphics, wrapping is the process of limiting a position to an area. A good example of wrapping is wallpaper, a single pattern repeated indefinitely over a wall. Wrapping is used in 3D computer graphics to repeat a texture over a polygon, eliminating the need for large textures or multiple polygons.

To wrap a position x to an area of width w, calculate the value .

Implementation
For computational purposes the wrapped value x of x can be expressed as

Pseudocode for wrapping of a value to a range other than 0–1 is
 function wrap(X, Min, Max: Real): Real;
     X := X - Int((X - Min) / (Max - Min)) * (Max - Min);
     if X < 0 then // This corrects the problem caused by using Int instead of Floor
         X := X + Max - Min;
     return X;

Pseudocode for wrapping of a value to a range of 0–1 is
 function wrap(X: Real): Real;
     X := X - Int(X);
     if X < 0 then         X := X + 1;
     return X;

Pseudocode for wrapping of a value to a range of 0–1 without branching is,
 function wrap(X: Real): Real;
     return' ((X mod 1.0) + 1.0) mod 1.0;

See also text wrapping 
Clamping

Computer graphics algorithms